The list of symphonies in F-sharp major includes:

Symphony in F-sharp major, Op. 40 by Erich Wolfgang Korngold, 1950
Symphony No. 10 by Gustav Mahler
Turangalîla-Symphonie by Olivier Messiaen

See also
List of symphonies by key

References

F sharp major
Symphonies